Melanothrix sanchezi is a moth in the family Eupterotidae. It was described by Schultze in 1925. It is found in the Philippines.

References

Moths described in 1925
Eupterotinae
Moths of the Philippines